The Town Center at Aurora (formerly known as Aurora Mall) is an enclosed, two-level regional shopping center located in Aurora, Colorado, and covers a leasable area over 1 million square feet.  It lies at the center of the commercial and retail district in the area, adjacent to Aurora City Square, Aurora City Place, and Aurora Park Shopping Center, a strip mall. The commercial district itself is located in central Aurora, and the mall's primary trade area includes a mostly suburban, middle-income demographic.

Anchor stores and major tenants at the mall are Dillard's (originally The Denver, became May-D&F in 1987, then Foley's in 1993), Macy's (originally May-D&F, became May-D&F Men's in 1987, then Foley's Men's in 1993, then a full-line Foley's in 2005), JCPenney, and Century Theatres with one vacant anchor last occupied by Sears.

History
Aurora Mall was developed in 1974, and was fully opened a year later in 1975.  The mall is set in a typical sprawling, suburban environment, and the demographics mostly reflect that trend.

In 2003, the mall announced a major two-part renovation with a cost of approximately $100 million.  The first part consisted of a remodeling of the Foley's department store, to a Dillard's that replaced the former anchor. Dillard's at Buckingham Square Mall, also in Aurora, closed, and moved into the newly renovated space.   The second part involved the rest of the mall, including the construction of a new food court, re-pavement, and other site upgrades. The renovation project was completed in 2005, and the mall reopened under its new name as Town Center at Aurora.

During the renovation project, a controversy arose regarding one of mall management's new focus on attracting a white-only clientele.  A top leasing agent was recorded in a conversation with a tenant, who served food that apparently catered to an ethnic minority.  The conversation seemed to provide the mall's new direction after renovations were complete: to discourage people of an ethnic minority from shopping there. City officials quickly condemned the "racist" views, and demanded an apology from Simon's management; no apology has yet been given.

In June 2005, a 19-year-old girl was killed when trying to break up a fight at the mall.

On August 31, 2019, it was announced that Sears would be closing this location a part of a plan to close 92 stores nationwide. The store closed on December 15, 2019.

2012 shooting

On July 20, 2012, a mass shooting occurred at the Century 16 at Town Center at Aurora, during a midnight screening of the film The Dark Knight Rises. A gunman, dressed in tactical clothing, set off tear gas grenades and shot into the audience with multiple firearms, killing 12 people and injuring 70 others. The gunman, James Holmes, was arrested outside the cinema minutes later. On August 24, 2015, he was sentenced to life in prison without the possibility of parole.

Community
Due in part to the Town Center's suburban environment and demographic, the Aurora Public Schools (APS) system and Aurora's PTO are heavily involved in the mall's events and activities.

The mall sponsors a "Cash for Class" program, which awards schools within the district based on a points system. Schools can get points for submitting report cards, attendance records, and even mall purchases. All rewards are provided directly to the schools. In 2011, Town Center at Aurora awarded a total of $13,000 to nine schools.

In 2009, APS announced a new computer system in a joint venture with the mall. Several kiosks were installed throughout the mall. The system allows parents to view grades, assignments, and other resources regarding their child's education, as well as to browse the mall's various shopping events.

Current Anchors 

 Century Aurora and XD (periphery)
 Dillard's (frmr Foley's)
 Fieldhouse USA (Coming Soon, former Sears)
 Hobby Lobby (periphery, former Gordman's)
 JCPenney
 Macy's

Former Anchors 

 Sears
 Gordmans (periphery)
 Foley's Department Store

Gallery

References

External links
Town Center at Aurora official website

Washington Prime Group
Shopping malls in Colorado
Tourist attractions in Arapahoe County, Colorado
Buildings and structures in Aurora, Colorado
Shopping malls established in 1974
Attacks on shopping malls
Attacks on buildings and structures in the United States
1974 establishments in Colorado